Right Angle Peak is a mountain in South West Tasmania.  It lies to the south east of the Frankland Range near the impoundment Lake Pedder.  It is surrounded by small lakes such as Lake Surprise to the east.  It is south west of Secheron Peak.

See also

 Strathgordon, Tasmania
 South West Wilderness, Tasmania

References
 Maconochie 4223, Edition 1 2003, Tasmania 1:25000 Series, Tasmap

Mountains of Tasmania
South West Tasmania